Doratopteryx dissemurus is a moth in the Himantopteridae family. It was described by Sergius G. Kiriakoff in 1963. It is found in Guinea.

References

Moths described in 1963
Himantopteridae